Razeghi (also known as Rāzeqān and Rāzqān) is a city and capital of Kharqan District, in Zarandieh County, Markazi Province, Iran.  At the 2006 census, its population was 426 in 138 families.

References

Cities in Markazi Province
Populated places in Zarandieh County